Artur Henryk Hajzer (28 June 1962 – 7 July 2013) was a Polish mountaineer. Hajzer climbed seven eight-thousanders, several via new routes (Manaslu’s NE face in 1986, Shishapangma’s east ridge in 1987) and made the first winter climb of Annapurna on February 3, 1987. He also summited Annapurna East (8010m) via a new route up the SE face in 1988. All these climbs were done together with Jerzy Kukuczka, without supplemental oxygen or Sherpa support. Artur also attempted Lhotse South Face three times, reaching 8200 m in 1985, 8300 m in 1987 and 7200 m (alpine style) in 1989. He also organised a rescue operation on Mount Everest’s West Ridge for Andrzej Marciniak in 1989. On September 30, 2011, he summited Makalu with Adam Bielecki and Tomasz Wolfart. In July 2013 he died after falling in the Japanese Coloir after an attempt to reach the summit of Gasherbrum I.

Ascents on the eight-thousanders
 1986 - Manaslu (new route)
 1987 - Annapurna (first winter ascent)
 1987 - Shishapangma (new route)
 1988 - Annapurna East (new route)
 2008 - Dhaulagiri 
 2010 - Nanga Parbat
 2011 - Makalu

See also
List of deaths on eight-thousanders

References

External links
MountEverest.net Polish mountaineering timeline
Ice Warriors not give up - HiMountain winter expedition to Broad Peak - 2008/09. HiMountain wyprawa zimowa Broad Peak - 2008/09. /Version english and polish/

1962 births
2013 deaths
Mountaineering deaths
Polish mountain climbers
People from Zielona Góra